Jure Godler (born 24 March 1984) is a Slovenian writer, actor, composer and comedian. He is best known for his impressions on the Slovenian National Television programme Hri-Bar.  He has also performed in America at The Improv in Los Angeles.

References 

1984 births
Living people
Slovenian male actors
Slovenian composers
Male composers
Slovenian comedians
Slovenian writers
Slovenian male musicians